Jack McGee (ca. 1932 – August 16, 2009) was a professional Canadian football player. McGee was born and raised in Toronto, Ontario. He attended Queen's University in Kingston, Ontario, and played university football for the Queen's Golden Gaels. In 1954, he played for the Toronto Argonauts and, in 1955, he played for the Hamilton Tiger-Cats. He and his wife Mary had four children, Steven, David, Suzi, and J.R.. He died on August 16, 2009, in Peterborough, Ontario, at the age of 77.

References 

1932 births
2009 deaths
Canadian football offensive linemen
Hamilton Tiger-Cats players
Canadian people of Irish descent
Canadian football people from Toronto
Players of Canadian football from Ontario
Queen's Golden Gaels football players
Toronto Argonauts players